Islamic University College, Najah in Iraq is a private Iraqi university established in 2004 in Najaf, Iraq. The university was established in 2004 by Sadiruldeen Al-Gubanchi. The university currently enrolls approximately 7000 students. The college is recognized by the Iraqi Ministry of Higher Education and Scientific Research.

History 
The University Islamic College obtained official recognition and a foundation license from the Ministry of Higher Education and Scientific Research, according to its book No. And private colleges No. (13) for the year 1996. The college was also granted a foundation license from the General Secretariat of the Council of Ministers in the name of (The Islamic University College in Najaf) in its letter No. 331906 on 5/11/2009 approved by Cabinet Resolution No. 381 of 2009.

Departments 
The college awards Bachelor degrees in its various departments. Departments include:
Law
Political and International Sciences
Quranic and Linguistic Studies
Islamic Doctrine
Media
Technology of Computer Engineering
Technology of Air Conditioning Engineering

References

See also 
 List of universities in Iraq

Universities in Iraq
Educational institutions established in 2004
2004 establishments in Iraq
Islamic universities and colleges in Iraq